The 1983 Iowa Hawkeyes football team represented the University of Iowa in the 1983 NCAA Division I-A football season. The Hawkeyes, led by head coach Hayden Fry, were members of the Big Ten Conference and played their home games at Kinnick Stadium. Iowa finished the season 9–3 (7–2 Big Ten), capped by a loss to Florida in the Gator Bowl.

Schedule

Roster

Coaching staff

Five of the staff would go on to become the winningest head coaches at five different programs: Snyder (Kansas State), Alvarez (Wisconsin), Stoops (Oklahoma), McCarney (Iowa State) and Ferentz (Iowa)

Rankings

Game summaries

at Iowa State

Sources: Box Score and Game Story

This was the first of 15 straight wins in the series for the Hawkeyes.

Owen Gill 16 Rush, 136 Yds, 4 TD

at Penn State

Sources: Box Score and Game Story

Ohio State

Sources: Box score and Game story, Box score
    
    
    
    
    
    

The Hawkeyes earned their first win over the Buckeyes since 1962.

at Illinois

Sources: Box Score and Game Story

The Hawkeyes – ranked #3 in the Coaches poll and #4 in the AP poll – could not break through on this day in Champaign. Illinois would go on to win the outright Big Ten title by finishing 9-0 in conference play.

Northwestern

Sources: Box Score and Game Story

The Hawkeyes set a Big Ten record with 713 yards of total offense.
 Chuck Long: 23-33, 420 yards, 4 TD (1 rushing)

Purdue

Sources: Box Score and Game Story

at Michigan

Sources: Box Score and Game Story

Indiana

Sources: Box Score and Game Story

Dave Moritz – 11 receptions, 192 receiving yards, 2 TD

at Wisconsin

Sources: Box Score and Game Story

Chuck Long – 4 TD passes
Eddie Phillips – 162 Rush yards, TD

at Michigan State

Sources: Box Score and Game Story

Minnesota

Sources: Box score

The Hawkeyes rolled up a school-record 517 yards rushing against the Gophers. Three Iowa backs went over 100 yards, led by Eddie Phillips with 172 yards and 3 touchdowns. Ronnie Harmon had 75 yards and 2 touchdowns on only 4 carries, and also caught a touchdown pass.

vs. Florida (Gator Bowl)

Awards and honors

Team players in the 1984 NFL Draft

References

Iowa
Iowa Hawkeyes football seasons
Iowa Hawkeyes football